Steppin' Out of Line is a song by Elvis Presley. It was recorded for Presley's 1961 film “Blue Hawaii.” However, the song was cut from the finished film and did not appear on the film's soundtrack. Instead, “Steppin’ Out of Line” was used as track 5 on Presley's “Pot Luck” album. In 1997, the “Blue Hawaii” soundtrack was rereleased with several bonus tracks, including “Steppin’ Out of Line.”

Elvis Presley songs
1961 songs
Songs with lyrics by Fred Wise (songwriter)
Songs written by Dolores Fuller
Songs with music by Ben Weisman